The Minister of International Trade and Industry, is a minister in the Government of Malaysia, with responsibility for the Ministry of International Trade and Industry (MITI).

The incumbent minister is Tengku Zafrul Aziz who was appointed by Anwar Ibrahim on 3 December 2022.

List of ministers of international trade
The following individuals have been appointed as Minister of International Trade, or any of its precedent titles:

Political Party:

List of ministers of trade
The following individuals have been appointed as Minister of Trade, or any of its precedent titles:

Political Party:

List of ministers of industry
The following individuals have been appointed as Minister of Industry, or any of its precedent titles:

Political Party:

References

Ministry of International Trade and Industry (Malaysia)
Lists of government ministers of Malaysia
Trade ministers
Industry ministers